Zhemchuzhnikov (from жемчуг meaning pearl) is a Russian masculine surname, its feminine counterpart is Zhemchuzhnikova. It may refer to
Aleksey Zhemchuzhnikov (1821–1908), Russian poet, dramatist, essayist
Yuri Zhemchuzhnikov (1885–1957), Russian geologist

Russian-language surnames